Prince Kasper Doenhoff (1587–1645) was a Polish nobleman of Baltic-German extraction, a Reichsfürst of the Holy Roman Empire and Governor of Dorpat Province within the Polish–Lithuanian Commonwealth. Upon converting to Catholicism, he became a trusted courtier and advisor to Sigismund III of Poland.

Titles
He became titular Governor of Dorpat (1627–34) (although already in 1625 the town had capitulated to Sweden and was never reobtained by the Poles); from 1633, Count of the Holy Roman Empire (along with Ernst and Gerhard Dönhoff); Governor of Sieradz (1634–45); Court Marshal of the Queen (from 1639); and starosta of Wieluń, Lauenburg (Lębork), Radomsko, Bolesławiec, Sokal, Małoszyce, Sobowidze and Klonowo.

In the Holy Roman Empire, he was a noble (Reichsfürst); count (from 1635); prince (from 1637); and court marshal.

Life
A member of the Westphalian, Prussian and Baltic-German von Dönhoff family that also included Ernst Magnus Dönhoff and Marion Dönhoff, Kasper became a military commander (rotmistrz of reiters), a favorite of King Sigismund III Vasa (after his conversion) and one of the most prominent members of the "court faction" that advocated strengthening the Polish monarch's power.

As a courtier of King Władysław IV Vasa, Doenhoff was sent with a diplomatic mission to propose the marriage of Archduchess Cecilia Renata of Austria, daughter of Holy Roman Emperor Ferdinand II, to Władysław IV. The mission was successful, and Kasper also received noble titles from the Holy Roman Emperor.

In Poland
Kasper Doenhoff was the first member of his family to enter the magnate ruling elite of the Polish–Lithuanian Commonwealth, thereby laying the foundations for his family's fortune.

He was influential and wealthy, enabling him to fund several interesting construction projects, mostly in Sieradz Province. He ordered the rebuilding of a medieval castle at Bolesławiec (of which he was starosta), on the Prosna River, into a new residence, complete with Italian garden. Around 1630 he sponsored a Renaissance-Baroque castle in Kruszyna — the last residential complex in Poland planned around a Renaissance-style internal yard, but already with a Baroque-style grand front yard and garden.

Kruszyna was Doenhoff's main residence; but it was inconveniently located far from the new Commonwealth capital, Warsaw. Hence in 1636 Doenhoff bought and rebuilt another estate, in Ujazd, where he replaced the old castle with a Baroque palace.

Toward the end of his life, he ordered the construction of a family necropolis, centered around a domed chapel, in the Jasna Góra sanctuary at Częstochowa. It was completed by his descendants.

Despite his ownership of several castles, Doenhoff often resided in a modest manor (dworek szlachecki) near the royal residence at Warsaw.

Family
Doenhoff was the son of Gerhard Dönhoff (?-1598) and Margaretha von Zweiffeln.

He was the brother of Ernst Magnus Dönhoff (Governor of Parnawa), Hermann Dönhoff and Gerhard Dönhoff (1590-1648, Governor of Pomorze).

In 1620 he married Anna Aleksandra Koniecpolska. They had four children: Aleksander Doenhoff, Stanislaw Doenhoff (?–1653), Zygmunt Doenhoff, and Anna Doenhoff (who married Bogusław Leszczyński).

See also
Stanisław Ernest Denhoff (1673-1728)

References

Kajzer L., "A Sieradz 'Palace Decade'? Kacper Denhoff'S Foundations in the First Half of the 17th Century," Kwartalnik Historii Kultury Materialnej (Quarterly of the History of Material Culture),  vol. 52, no. 4, 2004, pp. 403–18.
https://web.archive.org/web/20110725022228/http://genealog.home.pl/gd/szablony/osoba.php?lang=pl&id=016413

1587 births
1645 deaths
Converts to Roman Catholicism from Calvinism
Polish Roman Catholics
Polish Princes of the Holy Roman Empire
Polish Counts of the Holy Roman Empire
17th-century Polish nobility
Baltic-German people
Kasper Doenhoff